Bayble Island lies at the southern end of Bayble Bay (Pabail Bay). It consists of two islands (Eilean Mòr Phabaill and Eilean Beag Phabaill), but these appear as a single island from most directions. The hamlets of Upper and Lower Bayble overlook the island and bay.
Bayble Island is an uninhabited island off the south coast of the Eye Peninsula of Lewis, in the Outer Hebrides of Scotland.

Wildlife
Rats are thought to have arrived on the island, as to the Shiant Islands, from a shipwreck (although this may be folklore). Gannets and other seabirds can be seen on the island and diving into the surrounding waters.

See also

 List of islands of Scotland

Footnotes

Islands off Lewis and Harris
Isle of Lewis
Uninhabited islands of the Outer Hebrides